This article is a list of principal owners of National Basketball Association teams:

See also  

 List of National Basketball Association head coaches
 List of National Basketball Association team presidents
 List of National Basketball Association general managers
 List of professional sports team owners
 List of NHL franchise owners
 List of NFL franchise owners
 List of Major League Baseball principal owners
 List of MLS team owners

References
General

Specific

National Basketball Association lists